Fugu is an SFTP client for Mac OS X. It has been abandoned by the developers as of 2011. The software as of that time is available on SourceForge.

Fugu was developed by the University of Michigan's Research Systems Unix Group (RSUG). It is a graphical shell for OpenSSH tools that provides a simple interface to all of the features that SSH has.

The name of the program is an homage to the Blowfish encryption algorithm used by OpenSSH, as a fugu is a type of blowfish.

Further reading

References

External links

 SourceForge Archive

Free FTP clients
MacOS-only free software
SSH File Transfer Protocol clients
Software using the BSD license
Apple Design Awards recipients